Derbyshire County Cricket Club in 1927 represents the cricket season when the English club Derbyshire had been playing for fifty six years. It was their twenty-ninth season in the County Championship and they won eight matches to finish fifth in the County Championship..

1927 season

Derbyshire played 24 games in the County Championship, and one match against the touring New Zealanders. They lost to the New Zealanders but lost only three championship games while most of the matches ended in draws.

Guy Jackson was in his sixth season as captain. Archibald Slater was top scorer and GM Lee  took most wickets with 72. In the match against Northamptonshire at Northampton, Lee scored a century and took a total of 12 wickets

Denis Smith made his debut in 1927, the start of a long career with the club. Archibald Slater    returned to play for Derbyshire having last played in the 1921 season.

Matches

Statistics

County Championship batting averages

County Championship bowling averages

Wicket Keeper

H Elliott Catches 33  Stumping 14

See also
Derbyshire County Cricket Club seasons
1927 English cricket season

References

1927 in English cricket
Derbyshire County Cricket Club seasons
English cricket seasons in the 20th century